This is a list of graveyards, burial grounds and cemeteries in Edinburgh.

Cemeteries in Council Control
See
Colinton Cemetery
Comely Bank Cemetery (previously private)
Corstorphine Hill Cemetery (previously private) (includes a woodland cemetery section)
Craigmillar Castle Park Cemetery (the most recent cemetery)
Dalry Cemetery
East Preston Street Burial Ground
Grange Cemetery
Jewish Cemetery, Sciennes House Place
Kirkliston Cemetery
Liberton Cemetery
Morningside Cemetery (previously private)
Mortonhall Cemetery and Crematorium
New Calton Burial Ground, Regent Road
Newington Cemetery (includes a large Jewish section)
North Leith Burial Ground, Coburg Street
North Merchiston Cemetery, Ardmillan Terrace (previously private)
Old Calton Burial Ground, Waterloo Place/Regent Road
Portobello Cemetery (includes a large Muslim section)
Ratho Cemetery
Rosebank Cemetery, Pilrig Street (includes a Sikh section)
Saughton Cemetery, Chesser Loan (previously private)
South Queensferry Cemetery
Warriston Cemetery (previously private)
Wauchope Burial Ground (also known as Niddrie Marishal Burial Ground), Greendykes Road

Churchyards in Council Control 
See

Buccleuch Churchyard, Buccleuch Street
Canongate Church
Colinton Churchyard
Corstorphine Parish Church
Cramond Churchyard
Currie Churchyard
Dalmeny Churchyard
Duddingston Churchyard
Gogar Churchyard
Greyfriars Kirkyard adjacent to Greyfriars Kirk
Liberton Churchyard
Ratho Churchyard
Restalrig Churchyard
St Cuthberts, Lothian Road
St Mary and St James, Newhaven Main Street (small and ruinous)
South Leith Parish Church
Vennel, South Queensferry

Cemeteries in Private Control
Dean Cemetery
Eastern Cemetery (off Easter Road)
Mount Vernon RC Cemetery, controlled by Roman Catholic Archdiocese of St Andrews and Edinburgh
Piershill Cemetery
Seafield Cemetery and Crematorium
Warriston Crematorium and Gardens of Remembrance

Graveyards in Private/Church Control
See 
Holyrood Abbey (Historic Scotland)
Holy Trinity Episcopal Church, Dean Bridge (small outer terraced area plus crypt below)
North Leith Church, Madeira Street
Portobello Old Parish Church, Pittville Street (most stones removed but previously vaults stood on all outer walls)
Quaker graveyard, The Pleasance (University of Edinburgh)
St Johns, Princes Street
St Marks, Portobello
Old Portobello Parish Church (Bellfield Street) partly built over, now in community use

Wholly Destroyed Burial Grounds

St Giles Cathedral Burial Ground (removed to build the Law Courts)
St Nicholas (Citadel) Burial Ground in Leith removed to build Cromwell's Citadel
Kirk o' Field Churchyard (now the central quadrangle of Old College)

References

Bibliography

Cemeteries in Scotland
Graveyards and cemeteries